Bump or bumps may refer to:

Arts and entertainment
 Bump (dance), a dance from the 1970s disco era
 BUMP (comics), 2007-8 limited edition comic book series

Fictional characters
 Bobby Bumps, titular character of a series of American silent animated short films produced (1915–1925)
 Bump (Transformers), a fictional character in the Transformers universe
 Mr. Bump, a Mr. Men character

Music
 "The Bump", a funky song by the Commodores from Machine Gun(1974)
 "The Bump", a 1974 hit single by the band Kenny
 Bump (album), a jazz album recorded by musician John Scofield in 2000
 "Bump", a song by Raven-Symoné from This Is My Time
 "Bump", a song by Fun Lovin' Criminals from Loco
 "Bump", a song by Spank Rock from YoYoYoYoYo
 "Bump", a song by Rehab from Graffiti the World
 "Bump", a song by Baby Blue from No Smoke Without Fire
 "Bump", a song by Brockhampton from Saturation
 "Bump", a 2006 song by Spank Rock

Television
 Bump!, a Canadian gay and lesbian travel and lifestyle television series
 Bump, a pricing game on The Price Is Right television game show
 Bump (Australian TV series), a 2021 Australian streaming television drama series
 Bump (British TV series), a 1990 British children's animated programme featuring an elephant

Culture
 Elbow bump, an informal greeting where two people touch or tap elbows
 Fist bump, an informal greeting
 The bumps, a birthday tradition

Infrastructure and industry
 Bump, airline travel slang for the involuntary denial of boarding to passengers on an overbooked flight
 Bump (union), in a unionised work environment, a reassignment of jobs on the basis of seniority
 Bumper music or bump, in radio broadcasting a short clip of music used for transitions between program elements
 Coal mine bump, a seismic jolt occurring within a mine

People
 Bump (nickname)
 Bump (surname)

Sport
 Bump (football), a body contact alternative to a tackle and shepherding method in Australian rules football
 Bump (game), a basketball elimination game
 Bump (professional wrestling), making actual contact with another individual, an object, or the ground
 Bumps race, a type of rowing competition

Other uses
 Bump (application), a popular app for the iPhone and Android smartphones which allowed users to easily share information
 Bump (Internet), a term for moving a thread to the top of a forum
 The Bump, a knoll on South Georgia Island; see Fortuna Bay
 Bumps River, in Centerville, Cape Cod, Massachusetts, U.S.

See also
 
 
 "Bump Bump!", 2009 single from BoA
 "Bump, Bump, Bump", a 2003 single by B2K featuring P. Diddy
 Speed bump, a raised portion of road designed to slow traffic
 "Bumped" (song), by Right Said Fred
 Bumper (disambiguation)
 Bumping (disambiguation)